Tupua may refer to:

 The five principal gods of Niuean mythology, Fao, Fakahoko, Huanaki, Lage-iki, Lagi-atea
 Tipua, a spirit in Maori mythology
 Tupua Tamasese, the title of a paramount chief of Samoa
 Tufuga Efi, also known as Tupua Tamasese Tupuola Tufuga Efi, former Prime Minister of Samoa
 Tupua (spider), a spider genus